Umali is a village in Malkapur tehsil of Buldhana district in Maharashtra, India. Nearby towns are Malkapur on west, Nandura on East. Village has a highschool Adarsh Vidyalay and a district sub hospital.There is also a Zilla Parishad High School. The village had a population of 4,373 in 2011.

References

Villages in Buldhana district